Cespitularia is a genus of soft corals in the family Xeniidae.

Species
The World Register of Marine Species lists the following species:

Cespitularia coerula May, 1898 
Cespitularia densa Tixier-Durivault, 1966 
Cespitularia erecta Macfadyen, 1936 
Cespitularia exigua Verseveldt, 1970 
Cespitularia hypotentaculata Roxas, 1933 
Cespitularia infirmata Verseveldt, 1977 
Cespitularia mantoni Hickson, 1931
Cespitularia mollis (Brundin, 1896) 
Cespitularia multipinnata (Quoy & Gaimard, 1833)
Cespitularia quadriserta Roxas, 1933 
Cespitularia robusta Tixier-Durivault, 1966 
Cespitularia schlichteri Janes, 2008 
Cespitularia simplex Thomson & Dean 
Cespitularia stolonifera Gohar, 1938 
Cespitularia subviridus (Quoy & Gaimard, 1833) 
Cespitularia taeniata May, 1899 
Cespitularia turgida Verseveldt, 1971 
Cespitularia wisharti Hickson, 1931

References

Xeniidae
Octocorallia genera